Restoration ecology is the scientific study supporting the practice of ecological restoration, which is the practice of renewing and restoring degraded, damaged, or destroyed ecosystems and habitats in the environment by active human interruption and action. Effective restoration requires an explicit goal or policy, preferably an unambiguous one that is articulated, accepted, and codified. Restoration goals reflect societal choices from among competing policy priorities, but extracting such goals is typically contentious and politically challenging.

Natural ecosystems provide ecosystem services in the form of resources such as food, fuel, and timber; the purification of air and water; the detoxification and decomposition of wastes; the regulation of climate; the regeneration of soil fertility; and the pollination of crops. These ecosystem processes have been estimated to be worth trillions of dollars annually. There is consensus in the scientific community that the current environmental degradation and destruction of many of Earth's biota are taking place on a "catastrophically short timescale". Scientists estimate that the current species extinction rate, or the rate of the Holocene extinction, is 1,000 to 10,000 times higher than the normal, background rate. Habitat loss is the leading cause of both species extinctions and ecosystem service decline. Two methods have been identified to slow the rate of species extinction and ecosystem service decline, they are the conservation of currently viable habitat and the restoration of degraded habitat. The commercial applications of ecological restoration have increased exponentially in recent years. In 2019, the United Nations General Assembly declared 2021–2030 the UN Decade on Ecosystem Restoration.

Definition

Restoration ecology is the academic study of the process, whereas ecological restoration is the actual project or process by restoration practitioners. The Society for Ecological Restoration defines "ecological restoration" as an "intentional activity that initiates or accelerates the recovery of an ecosystem with respect to its health, integrity and sustainability". Ecological restoration includes a wide scope of projects including erosion control, reforestation, removal of non-native species and weeds, revegetation of disturbed areas, daylighting streams, the reintroduction of native species (preferably native species that have local adaptation), and habitat and range improvement for targeted species. For many researchers, the ecological restoration must include the local communities: they call this process the "social-ecological restoration".

E. O. Wilson, a biologist, stated, "Here is the means to end the great extinction spasm. The next century will, I believe, be the era of restoration in ecology."

History
Restoration ecology emerged as a separate field in ecology in the late twentieth century. The term was coined by John Aber and William Jordan III when they were at the University of Wisconsin–Madison. However, indigenous peoples, land managers, stewards, and laypeople have been practicing ecological restoration or ecological management for thousands of years.

US 

Considered the birthplace of modern ecological restoration, the first tallgrass prairie restoration was the 1936 Curtis Prairie at the University of Wisconsin–Madison Arboretum. Civilian Conservation Corps workers replanted nearby prairie species onto a former horse pasture, overseen by university faculty including renowned ecologist Aldo Leopold, botanist Theodore Sperry, mycologist Henry C. Greene, and plant ecologist John T. Curtis. Curtis and his graduate students surveyed the whole of Wisconsin, documenting native species communities and creating the first species lists for tallgrass restorations. Existing prairie remnants, such as locations within pioneer cemeteries and railroad rights-of-way, were located and inventoried by Curtis and his team. The UW Arboretum was the center of tallgrass prairie research through the first half of the 20th century, with the development of the nearby Greene Prairie, Aldo Leopold Shack and Farm, and pioneering techniques like prescribed burning.

The latter half of the 20th century saw the growth of ecological restoration beyond Wisconsin borders. The 285-hectare Green Oaks Biological Field Station at Knox College began in 1955 under the guidance of zoologist Paul Shepard. It was followed by the 40-hectare Schulenberg Prairie at the Morton Arboretum, which started in 1962 by Ray Schulenberg and Bob Betz. Betz then worked with The Nature Conservancy to establish the 260-hectare Fermi National Laboratory tallgrass prairie in 1974. These major tallgrass restoration projects marked the growth of ecological restoration from isolated studies to widespread practice.

Australia 

Australia has also been the site of historically significant ecological restoration projects, commencing in the 1930s. These projects were responses to the extensive environmental damage inflicted by colonising settlers, following the forced dispossession of the First Nations communities of Australia. The substantial Traditional Ecological Knowledge of First Nations communities was not utilised in the historical restoration projects.

Many of the first Australian settler restoration projects were initiated by volunteers, often in the form of community groups. Many of these volunteers appreciated and utilised science resources, such as botanical and ecological knowledge. Local and state government agencies participated, and also industry. Australian scientists came to play an increasingly important role. A prominent scientist who took an interest in the reversal of vegetation degradation was botanist and plant ecologist Professor T G Osborn, University of Adelaide, who, in the 1920s, conducted pioneering research into the causes of arid-zone indigenous vegetation degradation. From this time, Australian botanists, plant ecologists and soil erosion researchers have increasingly developed interests in the recovery of ecological functioning on degraded sites.

The earliest known attempt by Australian settlers to restore a degraded natural ecosystem commenced in 1896, at Nairm (as it is known to people of the Kulin nation), or Port Phillip Bay, Melbourne. Local government and community groups replanted degraded areas of the foreshore reserves with the indigenous plant species, Coastal Teatree (Leptospermum laevigatum). Possibly the ecological aspirations were limited, as essentially, the projects were motivated by utilitarian considerations: to conserve recreation sites, and promote tourism. However, some local residents, such as distinguished Australian journalist, nature writer and amateur ornithologist, Donald Macdonald, were distressed at the loss of valued biological qualities, and campaigned to fully restore the Teatree ecosystems and conserve them and their indigenous fauna. Indeed, Macdonald espoused many of the principles and practices of ecological restoration, but he lacked opportunities to actually implement such a project.

The degraded arid-zone regions of Australia were the site of historical ecological restoration projects. Pastoral industry established in the arid-zone regions of South Australia and New South Wales resulted in the substantial degredation of these areas by ca.1900 resulting in severe wind erosion resulted. From approximately 1930, Australian pastoralists implemented revegetation projects aiming to the substantial to full restoration of indigenous flora to degraded, wind eroded areas.

At his arid-zone Koonamore research station in South Australia, established in 1925, Professor T G Osborn studied the loss of indigenous vegetation caused by overstocking and the resultant wind erosion and degradation, concluding that restoration of the indigenous saltbushes (Atriplex spp. ), bluebushes (Maireana spp.) and Mulga (Acacia aneura) vegetation communities was possible, if a stock exclosure and natural regeneration revegetation technique was applied to degraded paddocks (or fields). Most likely influenced by Osborn's research, throughout the 1930s South Australian pastoralists adopted this revegetation technique. At Wirraminna station (or property, ranch), for example, following fencing to exclude stock, severe 
soil-drifts were fully revegetated and stabilised by means of natural regeneration of the indigenous vegetation. Also, it was found that furrowing (or ploughing) of eroded areas resulted in the natural regeneration of indigenous vegetation. So successful were these programs that the South Australian government adopted them as approved state soil conservation policies in 1936. Legislation introduced in 1939 codified these policies.

In 1936 mining assayer Albert Morris and his restoration colleagues initiated the Broken Hill regeneration area project. This project involved the natural regeneration of indigenous flora on a severely wind eroded site of hundreds of hectares, located in arid western New South Wales. Morris was responding to the widespread wind erosion that had arisen from pastoral industry overstocking practices. It is quite likely that he was influenced by the South Australian research work of Professor Osborn.  Completed in 1958, the successful project still maintains substantial ecological functioning today as the Broken Hill Regeneration Area (1700 hectares). Morris was a pioneering and highly skilled arid-zone botanist, and was also familiar with some basic principles of ecology. Local and state governments, and the Broken Hill mining industry, supported and funded the project.

The Broken Hill regeneration area project has been described as an irrigation and tree planting project, and as a USA "dust bowl" shelterbelt planting project. However, to revegetate 1700 hectares by planting, hundreds of thousands of plants would have been required, but there is no historical documentation that reveals planting programs of this scale, or near it. Furthermore, although Morris did design some small tree planting and irrigation projects for the local community and a mining company, it is well documented that his main revegetation interest was in a stock exclosure and natural regeneration technique. As the historical documentation reveals, the regeneration area project relied almost entirely on the germination of the naturally distributed seed of the local indigenous flora species (natural regeneration), and the exclusion of damaging grazing animals (stock exclosure). In fact, as the regeneration area project was so well adapted to the harsh arid-zone conditions, the New South Wales state government adopted it as a model for the proposed restoration of the twenty million hectares of the arid western portion of the state that had been reduced to a severely eroded condition. Legislation to this effect was passed in 1949.

Another significant early Australian settler ecological restoration project occurred on the north coast of New South Wales. From approximately 1840 settlers forcibly occupied the coastal hinterlands, dispossessed First Nations communities, destroyed extensive areas of biologically diverse rainforest and converted the land to farms. Only smalll patches of rainforest survived. In 1935 dairy farmer Ambrose Crawford, alarmed by the possible loss of all of the rainforest, commenced restoring a degraded four acres (1.7 hectares) patch of local rainforest, or "Big Scrub" (Lowland Tropical Rainforest), as it was referred to, at Lumley Park reserve, Alstonville. Clearing of the weeds that were smothering the rainforest plants and planting of suitable indigenous rainforest species were his two main restoration techniques. Crawford utilised professional government botanists as advisors, and received support from his local government council. The restored rainforest reserve still exists today, a vital home to threatened plant and animal species.

Two attempted but ultimately unsuccessful projects that displayed many of the hallmarks of ecological restoration commenced in New South Wales in the early 1930s. Entomologist Walter Froggatt set out to restore Sydney Hawkesbury Sandstone flora to degraded Balls Head Reserve, Sydney Harbour, Sydney. Unfortunately, following Froggatt's death in 1937, the project lapsed into landscaping. About the same time, marine biologist David Stead commenced a project to restore the Australian Koala (Phascolarctos cinereus) to New South Wales, where it had been much slaughtered by hunters engaged in fur trading. Unfortunately, Stead's project ran into financial difficulties.

Dr John Wamsley purchased a dairy farm at Mylor, South Australia, in 1969. He fenced it with the view to restoring the native flora and fauna to the property. The property was renamed as Warrawong Sanctuary, it was opened to the public, and in 2000 Wamsley floated Earth Sanctuaries on the Australian Stock Exchange (ASX) with the view to replicating the ecological successes of Warrawong.

Traditional ecological knowledge and restoration ecology 
Traditional ecological knowledge (TEK) from Indigenous Peoples demonstrates how restoration ecology is a historical field, lived out by humans for thousands of years. Indigenous people have acquired ecological knowledge through observation, experience, and management of the natural resources and the environment around them. In the past, they used to manage their environment and changed the structure of the vegetation in a way not only to meet their basic needs (food, water, shelter, medicines) but also to improve desired characteristics and even increasing the populations and biodiversity. In that way, they were able to achieve a close relationship with the environment and learned lessons that indigenous people keep in their culture.

This means there are many things that could be learned from people locally indigenous to the ecosystem being restored because of the deep connection and biocultural and linguistic diversity of place. The dynamic of the use of natural resources by indigenous people contemplate many cultural, social, and environmental aspects, since they have always had an intimate connection with the animals and plants around them over centuries since they obtained their livelihood from the environment around them.

However, restoration ecologists must consider that TEK is place dependent due to intimate connection and thus when engaging Indigenous Peoples to include knowledge for restoration purposes, respect and care must be taken to avoid appropriation of the TEK. Successful ecological restoration which includes Indigenous Peoples must be led by Indigenous Peoples to ensure non-indigenous people acknowledge the unequal relationship of power.

Traditional Ecological Knowledge and Restoration Ecology in Practice 
Kat Anderson wrote a descriptive, historically based background book, Tending the Wild, about the indigenous peoples of the California coast and their intimate interactions with the environment. California Indians have a rigid and complex harvesting, management and production practice. The practices observed leaned heavily into typical horticultural techniques as well as concentrated forest burning. The applications of preservation and conservation based on the California Indians' practices, she hopes will assist in shattering the hunter-gatherer stereotype so long perpetuated in western literature. In "Tending the Wild", Anderson breaks down the concept that California was an untouched civilization that was built into a fertile environment by European explorers. However this is not an accurate depiction; though to Westerners it may not seem modernized, the native peoples have since defined what the population ecology was in that land. For them, Wilderness was land not tended to by humans at all. In "Indigenous Resource Management" Anderson sheds light on the diverse ways native peoples of California purposely harvested and managed the wild. The California Indians had a rich knowledge of ecology and natural techniques to understand burn patterns, plant material, cultivation, pruning, digging; what was edible vs. what was not. This did not just extend to plants but also into wildlife management – how abundant, where the distribution was, and how diverse the large mammal population was. "Restoration" covers how contemporary land uses caused degradation, fragmentation and loss of habitat. The way the United States has counteracted that is through land set aside from all human influence. As for the future, Anderson highly suggests looking to indigenous practices for ecosystem restoration and wildlife management.

Theoretical foundations 

Restoration ecology draws on a wide range of ecological concepts.

Disturbance 

Disturbance is a change in environmental conditions that disrupt the functioning of an ecosystem. Disturbance can occur at a variety of spatial and temporal scales, and is a natural component of many communities. For example, many forest and grassland restorations implement fire as a natural disturbance regime. However the severity and scope of anthropogenic impact has grown in the last few centuries. Differentiating between human-caused and naturally occurring disturbances is important if we are to understand how to restore natural processes and minimize anthropogenic impacts on the ecosystems.

Succession 

Ecological succession is the process by which a community changes over time, especially following a disturbance. In many instances, an ecosystem will change from a simple level of organization with a few dominant pioneer species to an increasingly complex community with many interdependent species. Restoration often consists of initiating, assisting, or accelerating ecological successional processes, depending on the severity of the disturbance. Following mild to moderate natural and anthropogenic disturbances, restoration in these systems involves hastening natural successional trajectories through careful management. However, in a system that has experienced a more severe disturbance (such as in urban ecosystems), restoration may require intensive efforts to recreate environmental conditions that favor natural successional processes.

Fragmentation 

Habitat fragmentation describes spatial discontinuities in a biological system, where ecosystems are broken up into smaller parts through land-use changes (e.g. agriculture) and natural disturbance. This both reduces the size of the population and increases the degree of isolation. These smaller and isolated populations are more vulnerable to extinction. Fragmenting ecosystems decreases the quality of the habitat. The edge of a fragment has a different range of environmental conditions and therefore supports different species than the interior. Restorative projects can increase the effective size of a population by adding suitable habitat and decrease isolation by creating habitat corridors that link isolated fragments. Reversing the effects of fragmentation is an important component of restoration ecology.

Ecosystem function 
Ecosystem function describes the most basic and essential foundational processes of any natural systems, including nutrient cycles and energy fluxes. An understanding of the complexity of these ecosystem functions is necessary to address any ecological processes that may be degraded. Ecosystem functions are emergent properties of the system as a whole, thus monitoring and management are crucial for the long-term stability of ecosystems. A completely self-perpetuating and fully functional ecosystem is the ultimate goal of restorative efforts. We must understand what ecosystem properties influence others to restore desired functions and reach this goal.

Community assembly 

Community assembly "is a framework that can unify virtually all of (community) ecology under a single conceptual umbrella". Community assembly theory attempts to explain the existence of environmentally similar sites with differing assemblages of species. It assumes that species have similar niche requirements, so that community formation is a product of random fluctuations from a common species pool. Essentially, if all species are fairly ecologically equivalent, then random variation in colonization, and migration and extinction rates between species, drive differences in species composition between sites with comparable environmental conditions.

Population genetics 
Genetic diversity has shown to be as important as species diversity for restoring ecosystem processes. Hence ecological restorations are increasingly factoring genetic processes into management practices.  Population genetic processes that are important to consider in restored populations include founder effects, inbreeding depression, outbreeding depression, genetic drift, and gene flow. Such processes can predict whether or not a species successfully establishes at a restoration site.

Applications

Leaf litter accumulation 
Leaf litter accumulation plays an important role in the restoration process. Higher quantities of leaf litter hold higher humidity levels, a key factor for the establishment of plants. The process of accumulation depends on factors like wind and species composition of the forest. The leaf litter found in primary forests is more abundant, deeper, and holds more humidity than in secondary forests. These technical considerations are important to take into account when planning a restoration project.

Soil heterogeneity effects on community heterogeneity 

Spatial heterogeneity of resources can influence plant community composition, diversity, and assembly trajectory. Baer et al. (2005) manipulated soil resource heterogeneity in a tallgrass prairie restoration project. They found increasing resource heterogeneity, which on its own was insufficient to ensure species diversity in situations where one species may dominate across the range of resource levels. Their findings were consistent with the theory regarding the role of ecological filters on community assembly. The establishment of a single species, best adapted to the physical and biological conditions can play an inordinately important role in determining the community structure.

Invasion and restoration 

Restoration is used as a tool for reducing the spread of invasive plant species many ways. The first method views restoration primarily as a means to reduce the presence of invasive species and limit their spread.  As this approach emphasizes the control of invaders, the restoration techniques can differ from typical restoration projects. The goal of such projects is not necessarily to restore an entire ecosystem or habitat. These projects frequently use lower diversity mixes of aggressive native species seeded at high density. They are not always actively managed following seeding. The target areas for this type of restoration are those which are heavily dominated by invasive species. The goals are to first remove the species and then in so doing, reduce the number of invasive seeds being spread to surrounding areas. An example of this is through the use of biological control agents (such as herbivorous insects) which suppress invasive weed species while restoration practitioners concurrently seed in native plant species that take advantage of the freed resources. These approaches have been shown to be effective in reducing weeds, although it is not always a sustainable solution long term without additional weed control, such as mowing, or re-seeding.

Restoration projects are also used as a way to better understand what makes an ecological community resistant to invasion. As restoration projects have a broad range of implementation strategies and methods used to control invasive species, they can be used by ecologists to test theories about invasion. Restoration projects have been used to understand how the diversity of the species introduced in the restoration affects invasion. We know that generally higher diversity prairies have lower levels of invasion. The incorporation of functional ecology has shown that more functionally diverse restorations have lower levels of invasion. Furthermore, studies have shown that using native species functionally similar to invasive species are better able to compete with invasive species. Restoration ecologists have also used a variety of strategies employed at different restoration sites to better understand the most successful management techniques to control invasion. To develop restoration ecology into a full science and to improve its practice requires generalizations about the processes governing the development of restored communities. While new experiments can be designed , one way forward is to use data from existing restoration studies to relate plant species performance to their ecological trait.

Successional trajectories 

Progress along a desired successional pathway may be difficult if multiple stable states exist. Looking over 40 years of wetland restoration data, Klötzli and Gootjans (2001) argue that unexpected and undesired vegetation assemblies "may indicate that environmental conditions are not suitable for target communities". Succession may move in unpredicted directions, but constricting environmental conditions within a narrow range may rein in the possible successional trajectories and increase the likelihood of the desired outcome.

Sourcing land for restoration 
A study quantified climate change mitigation potentials of 'high-income' nations shifting diets – away from meat-consumption – and restoration of the spared land. They find that the hypothetical dietary change "could reduce annual agricultural production emissions of high-income nations' diets by 61% while sequestering as much as 98.3 (55.6–143.7) Gt equivalent, equal to approximately 14 years of current global agricultural emissions until natural vegetation matures", outcomes they call 'double climate dividend'.

Sourcing material for restoration 
For most restoration projects it is generally recommended to source material from local populations, to increase the chance of restoration success and minimize the effects of maladaptation. However the definition of local can vary based on species. habitat and region. US Forest Service recently developed provisional seed zones based on a combination of minimum winter temperature zones, aridity, and the Level III ecoregions. Rather than putting strict distance recommendations, other guidelines recommend sourcing seeds to match similar environmental conditions that the species is exposed to, either now, or under projected climate change. For example, sourcing for Castilleja levisecta found that farther source populations that matched similar environmental variables were better suited for the restoration project than closer source populations. Similarly, a suite of new methods are surveying gene-environment interactions in order to identify the optimum source populations based on genetic adaptation to environmental conditions.

Principles

Rationale
There are many reasons to restore ecosystems.  Some include:

Restoring natural capital such as drinkable water or wildlife populations 
Helping human communities and the ecosystems upon which they depend adapt to the impacts of climate change (through ecosystem-based adaptation)
Mitigating climate change (e.g. through carbon sequestration)
Helping threatened or endangered species
Aesthetic reasons 
Moral reasons: human intervention has unnaturally destroyed many habitats, and there exists an innate obligation to restore these destroyed habitats
Regulated use/harvest, particularly for subsistence
Cultural relevance of native ecosystems to Native people
The environmental health of nearby populations 

There exist considerable differences of opinion on how to set restoration goals and how to define their success. Ultimately specifying the restoration target or desired state of an ecosystem is a societal choice, informed by scientists and technocrats, but ultimately it is a policy choice.  Selecting the desired goal can be politically contentious.  Some urge active restoration (e.g. eradicating invasive animals to allow the native ones to survive) and others who believe that protected areas should have the bare minimum of human interference, such as rewilding. Ecosystem restoration has generated controversy. Skeptics doubt that the benefits justify the economic investment or who point to failed restoration projects and question the feasibility of restoration altogether. It can be difficult to set restoration goals, in part because, as Anthony Bradshaw claims, "ecosystems are not static, but in a state of dynamic equilibrium…. [with restoration] we aim [for a] moving target."

Some conservationists argue that, though an ecosystem may not be returned to its original state, the functions of the ecosystem (especially ones that provide services to us) may be more valuable in its current configuration (Bradshaw 1987). This is especially true in cases where the ecosystem services are central to the physical and cultural survival of human populations, as is the case with many Native groups in the United States and other communities around the world who subsist using ecological services and environmental resources.  One reason to consider ecosystem restoration is to mitigate climate change through activities such as afforestation. Afforestation involves replanting forests, which remove carbon dioxide from the air. Carbon dioxide is a leading cause of global warming (Speth, 2005) and capturing it would help alleviate climate change. Another example of a common driver of restoration projects in the United States is the legal framework of the Clean Water Act, which often requires mitigation for damage inflicted on aquatic systems by development or other activities.

Challenges 
Some view ecosystem restoration as impractical, partially because restorations often fall short of their goals.  Hilderbrand et al. point out that many times uncertainty (about ecosystem functions, species relationships, and such) is not addressed, and that the time-scales set out for 'complete' restoration are unreasonably short, while other critical markers for full-scale restoration are either ignored or abridged due to feasibility concerns.  In other instances an ecosystem may be so degraded that abandonment (allowing a severely degraded ecosystem to recover on its own) may be the wisest option.  Local communities sometimes object to restorations that include the introduction of large predators or plants that require disturbance regimes such as regular fires, citing threat to human habitation in the area.  High economic costs can also be perceived as a negative impact of the restoration process.

Public opinion is very important in the feasibility of a restoration; if the public believes that the costs of restoration outweigh the benefits they will not support it.

Many failures have occurred in past restoration projects, many times because clear goals were not set out as the aim of the restoration, or an incomplete understanding of the underlying ecological framework lead to insufficient measures. This may be because, as Peter Alpert says, "people may not [always] know how to manage natural systems effectively".  Furthermore, many assumptions are made about myths of restoration such as carbon copy, where a restoration plan, which worked in one area, is applied to another with the same results expected, but not realized.

Science–practice gap 
One of the struggles for both fields is a divide between restoration ecology and ecological restoration in practice. Many restoration practitioners as well as scientists feel that science is not being adequately incorporated into ecological restoration projects. In a 2009 survey of practitioners and scientists, the "science-practice gap" was listed as the second most commonly cited reason limiting the growth of both science and practice of restoration.

There are a variety of theories about the cause of this gap. However, it has been well established that one of the main issues is that the questions studied by restoration ecologists are frequently not found useful or easily applicable by land managers. For instance, many publications in restoration ecology characterize the scope of a problem in-depth, without providing concrete solutions. Additionally many restoration ecology studies are carried out under controlled conditions and frequently at scales much smaller than actual restorations. Whether or not these patterns hold true in an applied context is often unknown. There is evidence that these small-scale experiments inflate type II error rates and differ from ecological patterns in actual restorations.  One approach to addressing this gap has been the development of International Principles & Standards for the Practice of Ecological Restoration by the Society for Ecological restoration (see below) – however this approach is contended, with scientists active in the field suggesting that this is restrictive, and instead principles and guidelines offer flexibility 

There is further complication in that restoration ecologists who want to collect large-scale data on restoration projects can face enormous hurdles in obtaining the data. Managers vary in how much data they collect, and how many records they keep. Some agencies keep only a handful of physical copies of data that make it difficult for the researcher to access. Many restoration projects are limited by time and money, so data collection and record-keeping are not always feasible. However, this limits the ability of scientists to analyze restoration projects and give recommendations based on empirical data.

Food security and nature degradation 
A range of activities in the name of "nature restoration", such as monoculture tree plantations, "degrade nature—destroying biodiversity, increasing pollution, and removing land from food production".

Consideration as a substitute for steep emission reductions 
Climate benefits from nature restoration are "dwarfed by the scale of ongoing fossil fuel emissions". It risks "over-relying on land for mitigation at the expense of phasing out fossil fuels". Despite of these issues, nature restoration is receiving increasing attention, with a study concluding that "Land restoration is an important option for tackling climate change but cannot compensate for delays in reducing fossil fuel emissions" as it's "unlikely to be done quickly enough to notably reduce the global peak temperatures expected in the next few decades".
For instance, researchers have compared reforestation and prevention of (mainly tropical) deforestation in specific:

Contrasting restoration ecology and conservation biology 

Restoration ecology may be viewed as a sub-discipline of conservation biology, the scientific study of how to protect and restore biodiversity. Ecological restoration is then a part of the resulting conservation movement.

Both restoration ecologists and conservation biologists agree that protecting and restoring habitat is important for protecting biodiversity. However, conservation biology is primarily rooted in population biology. Because of that, it is generally organized at the population genetic level and assesses specific species populations (i.e. endangered species). Restoration ecology is organized at the community level, which focuses on broader groups within ecosystems.

In addition, conservation biology often concentrates on vertebrate and invertebrate animals because of their salience and popularity, whereas restoration ecology concentrates on plants. Restoration ecology focuses on plants because restoration projects typically begin by establishing plant communities. Ecological restoration, despite being focused on plants, may also have "poster species" for individual ecosystems and restoration projects. For example, the Monarch butterfly is a poster species for conserving and restoring milkweed plant habitat, because Monarch butterflies require milkweed plants to reproduce. Finally, restoration ecology has a stronger focus on soils, soil structure, fungi, and microorganisms because soils provide the foundation of functional terrestrial ecosystems.

Natural Capital Committee's recommendation for a 25-year plan
The UK Natural Capital Committee (NCC) made a recommendation in its second State of Natural Capital report published in March 2014 that in order to meet the Government's goal of being the first generation to leave the environment in a better state than it was inherited, a long-term 25-year plan was needed to maintain and improve England's natural capital.  The UK Government has not yet responded to this recommendation.

The Secretary of State for the UK's Department for Environment, Food and Rural Affairs, Owen Paterson, described his ambition for the natural environment and how the work of the Committee fits into this at an NCC event in November 2012:  "I do not, however, just want to maintain our natural assets; I want to improve them. I want us to derive the greatest possible benefit from them, while ensuring that they are available for generations to come. This is what the NCC's innovative work is geared towards".

International Principles & Standards for the Practice of Ecological Restoration 
The Society for Ecological Restoration (SER) released the second edition of the International Standards for the Practice of Ecological Restoration on September 27, 2019, in Cape Town, South Africa, at SER's 8th World Conference on Ecological Restoration.  The publication provides updated and expanded guidance on the practice of ecological restoration, clarifies the breadth of ecological restoration and allied environmental repair activities, and includes ideas and input from a diverse international group of restoration scientists and practitioners.

The second edition builds on the first edition of the Standards, which was released December 12, 2016, at the Convention on Biological Diversity's 13th Conference of the Parties in Cancun, Mexico. The development of these Standards has been broadly consultative. The first edition was circulated to dozens of practitioners and experts for feedback and review. After release of the first edition, SER held workshops and listening sessions, sought feedback from key international partners and stakeholders, opened a survey to members, affiliates and supporters, and considered and responded to published critiques.

The International Principles and Standards for the Practice of Ecological Restoration:

 Present a robust framework to guide restoration projects toward achieving intended goals
 Address restoration challenges including: effective design and implementation, accounting for complex ecosystem dynamics (especially in the context of climate change), and navigating trade-offs associated with land management priorities and decisions
 Highlight the role of ecological restoration in connecting social, community, productivity, and sustainability goals
 Recommend performance measures for restorative activities for industries, communities, and governments to consider
 Enhance the list of practices and actions that guide practitioners in planning, implementation, and monitoring activities, including: appropriate approaches to site assessment and identification of reference ecosystems, different restoration approaches including natural regeneration, and the role of ecological restoration in global restoration initiatives
 Include an expanded glossary of restoration terminology
 Provide a technical appendix on sourcing of seeds and other propagules for restoration.

The Standards are available for free at www.ser.org/standards.

Related journals 
Restoration Ecology, journal of the Society for Ecological Restoration (SER)
Ecological Management & Restoration, published by the Ecological Society of Australia (ESA)
 Ecological Restoration, published by the University of Wisconsin Press

See also 

 Applied ecology
 Bioremediation
 Bush regeneration
 Conservation biology
 Desert greening
 Ecological design
 Ecological engineering
 Ecological triage
 Ecologically based invasive plant management
 Floodplain restoration
 Forest restoration
 Groundwater remediation
 Island restoration
 Land rehabilitation
 Reconciliation ecology
 Restoration economy
 Riparian zone restoration
 Stream restoration

References

Notes

Bibliography 

 Allen, M.F., Jasper, D.A. & Zak, J.C. (2002). Micro-organisms. In Perrow M.R. & Davy, A.J. (Eds.), Handbook of Ecological Restoration, Volume 1 Principles of Restoration, pp. 257–278. Cambridge: Cambridge University Press. 
 Anderson, M.K. (2005). Tending the Wild: Native American knowledge and the management of California's natural resources. Berkeley: University of California Press. 
 Ardill, Peter J. (2017) Albert Morris and the Broken Hill regeneration area: time, landscape and renewal. Australian Association of Bush Regenerators (AABR). Sydney. http://www.aabr.org.au/morris-broken-hill/ 
 Ardill, Peter J (2021) ‘Innovative Federation and Inter-war Period repair of degraded natural areas and their ecosystems: local government and community restoration of Coast Teatree Leptospermum laevigatum at Port Phillip Bay, Victoria, Australia’ The Repair Press Sydney (February) https://ecologicalrestorationhistory.org/articles/
 
 Baer, S.G., Collins, S.L., Blair, J.M., Knapp, A.K. & Fiedler, A.K. 2005. "Soil heterogeneity effects on tallgrass prairie community heterogeneity: an application of ecological theory to restoration ecology". Restoration Ecology 13 (2), 413–424.
 Bradshaw, A.D. (1987). Restoration: the acid test for ecology. In Jordan, W.R., Gilpin, M.E. & Aber, J.D. (Eds.), Restoration Ecology: A Synthetic Approach to Ecological Research, pp. 23–29. Cambridge: Cambridge University Press. 
  1997.  What do we mean by restoration?.  Restoration ecology and sustainable development., eds. Krystyna M., Urbanska, Nigel R., Webb, Edwards P.  University Press, Cambridge.
 Court, Franklin E. (2012) Pioneers of ecological restoration: the people and legacy of the University of Wisconsin Arboretum. Madison: University of Wisconsin Press.  
 Daily, G.C., Alexander, S., Ehrlich, P.R., Goulder, L., Lubchenco, J., Matson, P.A., Mooney, H.A., Postel, S., Schneider, S.H., Tilman, D. & Woodwell, G.M. (1997) "Ecosystem Services: Benefits Supplied to Human Societies by Natural Ecosystems". Issues in Ecology 1 (2), 1–18.
 Harris, J.A. (2003) Measurements of the soil microbial community for estimating the success of restoration. European Journal of Soil Science. 54, 801–808.
 Harris, J.A., Hobbs, R.J, Higgs, E. and Aronson, J. (2006) Ecological restoration and global climate change. Restoration Ecology 14(2) 170 - 176.
  2005. The myths of restoration ecology.  Ecology and Society 10(2): 19. Full Article
  2006.  Professor of environmental studies at the university of California santa cruz. Personal Communication.
 Jordan, William R. & Lubick, George M. (2012) Making nature whole: a history of ecological restoration. Washington, D.C. Island Press.  
 Klotzi, F. & Gootjans, A.P. (2001). Restoration of natural and semi-natural wetland systems in Central Europe: progress and predictability of developments. Restoration Ecology 9 (2), 209–219.
 Liu, John D (2011). Finding Sustainability in Ecosystem Restoration. Kosmos Fall | Winter 2011. Full Article
 Luken, J.O. (1990). Directing Ecological Succession. New York: Chapman and Hall. 
   2002. The ecological context: a species population perspective.  Cambridge University Press, Cambridge.
 Novacek, M.J. & Cleland, E.E. (2001). "The current biodiversity extinction event: Scenarios for mitigation and recovery". Proceedings of the National Academy of Sciences 98 (10), 5466–5470.
 Seabloom, E.W., Harpole, W.S., Reichman, O.J. & Tilman, D. 2003. "Invasion, competitive dominance, and resource use by exotic and native California grassland species". Proceedings of the National Academy of Sciences 100 (23), 13384–13389.
 SER (2004). The SER Primer on Ecological Restoration, Version 2. Society for Ecological Restoration Science and Policy Working Group. https://web.archive.org/web/20060207050251/http://www.ser.org/reading_resources.asp
 Shears N.T. (2007) Biogeography, community structure and biological habitat types of subtidal reefs on the South Island West Coast, New Zealand. Science for Conservation 281. p 53. Department of Conservation, New Zealand. 
  2004.  Red Sky at Morning:  America and the Crisis of the Global Environment. Yale University Press, Connecticut.
 van Andel, J. & Grootjans, A.P. (2006). Restoration Ecology: The New Frontier . In van Andel, J. & Aronson, J. (Eds.), Restoration Ecology, pp. 16–28. Massachusetts: Blackwell. 
 White, P.S. & Jentsch, A. (2004). Disturbance, succession and community assembly in terrestrial plant communities. In Temperton, V.K., Hobbs, R.J., Nuttle, T. & Halle, S. (Eds.), Assembly Rules and Restoration Ecology: Bridging the Gap Between Theory and Practice, pp. 342–366. Washington, DC: Island Press. 
 Wilson, E. O. (1988). Biodiversity. Washington DC: National Academy. 
 Young, T.P. (2000). "Restoration ecology and conservation biology". Biological Conservation. 92, 73–83.
 Young, T.P., Chase, J.M. & Huddleston, R.T. (2001). "Succession and assembly as conceptual bases in community ecology and ecological restoration". Ecological Restoration. 19, 5–19.
 Young, T.P., Petersen, D.A. & Clary, J.J. (2005). "The ecology of restoration: historical links, emerging issues and unexplored realms". Ecology Letters 8, 662–673.

External links

Restoration Ecology: The Journal of the Society for Ecological Restoration
Australian Ecological Restoration History
Society for Ecological Restoration
Restoration ecology working group at restoration-ecology.eu
 Nature - Revive Service
 Nature Education Knowledge entry on Restoration Ecology (peer-reviewed) at nature.com
 Green Infrastructure Resource Guide at asla.org
 Conservation Effects Assessment Project bibliographies at nal.usda.gov
 Seagrass Restoration Information at seagrassli.org
 Back to Natives Restoration (non-profit org.) at backtonatives.org
 A Guide to Prairie and Wetland Restoration In Eastern Nebraska
 EEMP – a non-profit 501(c)(3) organization dedicated to communicate the lessons of restoration through media around the world.
 Hope in a Changing Climate awarded documentary film on the potential of global ecosystem restoration
 Massachusetts Division of Ecological Restoration

 01
Bioremediation
Conservation biology
Habitat
Habitats
Landscape ecology
Phytoremediation plants
Sustainable gardening
Subfields of ecology